There are a number of languages spoken in Honduras though the official language is Spanish.

Studies 
Several studies have been carried out on the languages spoken in Honduras, including the following:

- Honduran Dictionary (Catracho), in 1899, Alberto de Jesús Membreño, published the first Honduran Dictionary with the title of "Honduranisms Vocabulary of the Provinces of Honduras", nourished with great part of the words and expressions collected in La Botica del pueblo of Doctor Francisco Cruz Castro.

In the twenty-second edition of the Spanish Royal Academy Dictionary, 2001, AHL made a valuable contribution to the Spanish-speaking world: 1,950 Hondurans were incorporated. In the twenty-first edition, in 1992, there were 302. Thus, there are about 2,702, including 400 Honduran gentilices, which makes Honduran Spanish speakers one of the greatest contributors of new lexical elements in that edition of the dictionary.

Dictionary: I know you, mosco 
Likewise, "I know you, Mosco - Dictionary of Honduran popular thought" (Juan Carlos I Spanish King of the Spanish Cultural Cooperation in Honduras), by Juan Ramón Saravia, compiled more than 2,700 words.

Dictionary of Languages of Honduras DLH 

In 2013, and after 4 years of work coordinated by Dr. Victor Manuel Ramos, the Honduran Academy of the Language AHL presents the "Dictionary of the Languages of Honduras", filled in by the portal dedicated to linguistic diversity of Honduras, with access to the dictionaries of 'Honduranisms' and of the 'Languages of Honduras DLH'.

Languages spoken in Honduras
In Honduras, dozens of languages were spoken before the Spanish conquest. The language most spoken was the Lenca language; after the conquest, the most spoken language became Castilian.

Spanish 

By far the most widely spoken language in the country, spoken natively by the vast majority of citizens regardless of ethnicity. Honduran Spanish is considered a variety of Central American Spanish.

Honduran Sign Language

Lenca 

The language of the Honduran Lencas is considered an extinct language. Because it is already in danger of extinction, it has a population of 300 to 594 semi-speakers. Its geographical location is between the western departments of Honduras, as they are: Lempira, Intibucá, La Paz, also they are in smaller quantity in the central departments of Santa Barbara, Comayagua Department, Francisco Morazán Department and Valley.

Ch’orti’ language 

The Chʼortiʼ people speak a Mayan language in the Ch'olan group. They have lost their language and have adopted the Spanish language.

Garifuna language 

They are the result of the mixture of African slaves (that shipwrecked in two ships in 1655 and another one that shipwrecked in 1675) with the Caribbean Indians (Amerindians, who had diverse languages called Caribbean languages), thus originated the black Caribs who dominated the Island of San Vicente until 1797, when they were expelled by the English towards Roatán and Trujillo.

Bay Islands English 

The Bay Islands are composed of larger islands called Utila, Roatan and Guanaja and their smaller islands or islets called Morat, Barbareta, Santa Elena and Cayos Cochinos. They are located on the northern coast of Honduras.

Their language is Creole English. Imported from England and Ireland, when the pirates and corsairs possessed these lands, when they attacked the ships of the Spanish Empire.

Tawahka or sumo language 

According to studies consulted, the Tawahka language and the Misquita are quite similar in their morphological and syntactic structure, although they do not have much lexicon in common. Both languages belong to the group macro-chibcha, linguistic group of South American origin. It is assumed that in very distant dates the ancestors of the Tawahkas, Misquitos and the branches (another related group), emigrated from what is now Colombia passing through the isthmus of Panama. The Tawahkas call their language Twanka, which shows a similarity to the name that, at the beginning of the seventeenth century, the Spaniards gave the Indians of the Guayape-Guayambre area: tahuajcas.
The mother tongue of this town is Tawahka, but they also speak Miskito and Spanish, although they still have some difficulty speaking Spanish.

Tolupan language

Paya language 

They call themselves "pech" which means "people," a term that is used to refer only to them; for the rest of the population they use the terms pech-akuá (the other people) or bulá that means ladino. Lehmann and Greenberg consider that the pech language comes from the chibcha, although some linguists consider it an isolated league.

Miskitu ethnicity 

It is a Mesoamerican ethnic group that has its own language, which occupied part of the territory of Honduras and El Salvador since pre-Columbian times.

In the time of the Spanish conquest only three lencas are named in the documents of that time: Mota, Entepica and Léppira.

Matagalpa language 

It is an extinct language of the Misumalpan languages that was the main language of the central highlands of the republic of Nicaragua and of the department of El Paraíso in The Republic of Honduras.

In El Paraíso, it was called the language of the "Chatos" and "Sules" of that Honduran department.

Classification 
Hondurans, as mentioned, are usually classified into six language families. Some of the languages are poorly documented, however, it seems that all languages documented in Honduras can be classified with reasonable certainty. Some of the languages are currently extinct (and here they are marked with the sign †). The table indicates the territories where the different languages were spoken, although in the actulidad the languages have disappeared of many of the indicated departments. The following list contains 12 languages between living languages and extinct languages:

See also
History of Honduras
Cariban languages
Languages of Belize
Elections in Honduras
National Congress of Honduras
Classification of indigenous languages of the Americas

External links
 UNITEC
 UNITEC on Honduran ethnic groups
FAO - General profile of Honduras
Rincón del Vago
 Consult the portal dedicado diversidad lingüística de Honduras, with queries to the dictionaries of  Hondureñismos  and of the  Languages of Honduras DLH  of the Academia Honduran of the Language AHL.

 
Ethnic groups in Honduras
Honduran culture